A Floorless Coaster is a type of steel roller coaster manufactured by Bolliger & Mabillard where riders sit with no floor underneath them, allowing their feet to swing freely just above the track. Development of the Floorless Coaster model began between 1995 and 1996 with Medusa at Six Flags Great Adventure opening on April 2, 1999, making it the world's first Floorless Coaster. Floorless Coasters also tend to have 3 to 7 inversions incorporated in the layout of the coaster.

Recently, Bolliger & Mabillard have used floorless trains on their Dive Coasters, such as Griffon and SheiKra. Though they contain floorless trains, the coasters are still not considered Floorless Coasters as B&M classifies them as another model. Maurer Söhne has designed their own version of the Floorless Coaster, a variant of their X-Car called X-Car Floorless, but currently do not have any installations.

History

According to Walter Bolliger, development of the Floorless Coaster began between 1995 and 1996. In 1999, the world's first Floorless Coaster opened at Six Flags Great Adventure as Medusa. With the success of Medusa, SeaWorld, Cedar Fair, Six Flags, and independent parks, Janfusun Fancyworld, Parque Warner Madrid, Tivoli Gardens, and Ocean Park Hong Kong have built other coasters of this model at their parks. B&M has built 13 Floorless Coasters from the ground up, with Dominator at Kings Dominion being the only one relocated to another park. They have also converted three of their stand-up roller coasters to Floorless Coasters: Rougarou at Cedar Point, Patriot at California's Great America, and Firebird at Six Flags America.

Design

The design of a Floorless Coaster has one main difference from traditional steel roller coasters around the world: there is no floor under the seats. While a train is parked in the station, a floor is used only for loading and unloading purposes. Because the front row has nothing in front of it to stop riders from walking over the edge of the station, a gate is placed in front of the train to prevent this from happening. Once all the over-the-shoulder restraints are locked, the floor separates into several pieces and retracts underneath the station. The gate then opens, allowing the train to move forward. When the train returns to the station, the floor is brought back up and the gate is closed for the next group of riders to load and unload. Aside from the station, Floorless Coasters have similar layouts to B&M's sit-down coasters.

Installations 

Bolliger & Mabillard has built thirteen Floorless Coasters from the ground up, with three additional that were converted from stand-up roller coasters. The roller coasters are listed in order of opening dates.

Note: Although some Dive Coasters (such as SheiKra, Griffon, Valravn and Yukon Striker) feature floorless trains, they are not considered Floorless Coasters.

Similar rides
Maurer Söhne, a German roller coaster and steel manufacturer, has developed their own version of the Floorless Coaster called the X-Car Floorless. The car is the same as the original X-Car with the only difference being that there is no floor during the ride. As of 2019, no X-Car Floorless roller coasters have been manufactured.

See also
 Dive Coaster, a type of roller coaster also designed by Bolliger & Mabillard, that feature floorless trains on some models.

Notes

References

External links 

Bolliger & Mabillard's Floorless Coaster

 
Roller coasters manufactured by Bolliger & Mabillard